Richard Farrant (c. 1525 – 30 November 1580) was an English composer, musical dramatist, theater founder, and Master of the Children of the Chapel Royal. The first acknowledgment of him is in a list of the Gentlemen of the Chapel Royal in 1552. The year of his birth cannot be accurately determined. During his life he was able to establish himself as a successful composer, develop the English drama considerably, found the first Blackfriars Theatre, and be the first to write verse-anthems. He married Anne Bower, daughter of Richard Bower who was Master of the Chapel Royal choristers at the time. With Anne he conceived ten children, one of whom was also named Richard.

Work with Royalty

As a member of the Gentleman of the Chapel Royal, Farrant was active in ceremonies surrounding the royal family. He began his work with the Chapel Royal around 1550 under the reign of Edward VI. Fortunately, for Farrant, this is a time that saw huge developments in Latin Church Music. Composers like William Byrd and Christopher Tye were busy expanding and elaborating on the Church Music of the day.  In Farrant's twelve years with the Chapel Royal, he was able to participate in funerals for Edward VI and Mary I, and coronations for Mary I and Elizabeth I. After his work there, he took up a post as lay vicar and organist at St. George's Chapel at Windsor.

Postings

For Farrant, the post at Windsor became a permanent one that he retained for the rest of his life. Along with this, he also acquired the position of Master of the Chapel Royal choristers in November 1569.  Having the choirs of both of these institutions at his disposal gave him an outlet to showcase all of his compositions and plays. In fact, every winter he was able to produce a play for the Queen herself. These positions also allowed him to move back to London in 1576 and begin a public theater of sorts where he rehearsed some of his choir music openly. It was soon after, in 1580, that he died, having left his house to his wife.

Important contributions

Unlike many composers of his day that stuck to only music composition, Farrant also wrote many plays. One of his most important contributions to drama in England is of course the creation of the first Blackfriars Theatre. This eventually became one of the most important places in London for drama to develop during the Renaissance. Farrant is also one of the earliest and most well known composers that began to mix the two mediums of music and drama. It was this uncommon mixture that allowed him to begin to develop the composition style of 'verse.' This becomes prominent in a lot of his pieces including the anthems When as we sat in Babylon, Call to remembrance and Hide not thou thy face.

Works
Because of the time gap, many of Farrant's works are only known because of careful documentation or brief mention from other documents.

Compositions

Ah, alas, You Salt Sea Gods (included in the Dow Partbooks)
Call to Remembrance
Hide Not Thou Thy Face
Lord, for Thy Tender Mercy's Sake    
Magnificat & Nunc Dimittis
O Jove, from Stately Throne
O Sacrum Convivium
Single Chant in F Major
Felix Namque
Voluntarye

Dramatic works

Ajax and Ulysses
Quintus Fabius
The History of Mutius Scevola
Xerxes
The History of Loyaltie and Bewtie
The History of Alucius
Orestes
Panthea and Abradatas

References

External links
 
 

1525 births
1580 deaths
Renaissance composers
English classical composers
English classical organists
British male organists
Gentlemen of the Chapel Royal
16th-century English composers
16th-century English musicians
English male classical composers
Masters of the Children of the Chapel Royal
Male classical organists